Highway 364 is a highway in the Canadian province of Saskatchewan. It runs from Highways 1 and 46 near Balgonie to Highway 10 near Edgeley.

Highway 364 intersects Highway 734 and Highway 640. It passes near the communities of Edenwold and Avonhurst.

Major intersections 
From west to east:

References

364